This is a chronological list of the first women to be heads of state and heads of government in Muslim-majority countries, excluding those who held the role in a temporary capacity.

List

See also
List of Muslim women heads of state and government
List of elected and appointed female heads of state and government
Muslim women political leaders
Council of Women World Leaders
Women in government

Muslim-majority
Muslim-majority
First female heads of governments, Muslim-majority
First female heads of governments, Muslim-majority
First female government heads
First female government heads
Female government heads
First female heads of government, Muslim-majority